The Thruster T600 Sprint is a British ultralight aircraft, designed and produced by Thruster Air Services of Langworth, Lincolnshire and introduced in the mid-1990s. The aircraft is supplied as a complete ready-to-fly-aircraft.

Design and development
The aircraft complies with the Fédération Aéronautique Internationale microlight rules and UK certified under BCAR Section "S". It features a strut-braced high-wing, a two-seats-in-side-by-side configuration enclosed cockpit accessed via doors, fixed tricycle landing gear or conventional landing gear and a single engine in tractor configuration.

The aircraft is made from bolted-together aluminum tubing, with its flying surfaces covered in treated Dacron sailcloth and a fibreglass cockpit fairing. Fittings and mounts are 316 stainless steel and 4130 steel. The engine is mounted on the keel tube, above the cockpit. Standard engines available are the  Rotax 582 two-stroke and the  Jabiru 2200 four-stroke powerplant.

Variants

T600N
Nose wheel version
T600T
Tailwheel version

Specifications (T600 Sprint)

See also
Similar aircraft
Raj Hamsa X-Air

References

External links

1990s British ultralight aircraft
Thruster Air Services aircraft
Single-engined tractor aircraft
High-wing aircraft